Subramanyaraje  Urs (1916 – 19 October 1998), known by his pseudonym Chaduranga, was an Indian writer in Kannada language. He wrote four novels—Sarvamangala, Uyyale, Vaishakha, and Hejjala—and a few other short stories. Chaduranga directed the on-screen version of Sarvamangala in 1968 while
Uyyale was made into a movie of same name in 1969.

Awards
Chaduranga was honoured with the State Sahitya Academy Award in 1982, the Karnataka State Rajyotsava award, the Central Sahitya Academy award, and an honorary doctorate by the Mysore University in 1993.

References

External links
Remembering Chaduranga
Personalities of Mysore-Chaduranga
 

Indian male novelists
1916 births
1998 deaths
Recipients of the Sahitya Akademi Award in Kannada
20th-century Indian novelists
Writers from Mysore
Novelists from Karnataka
20th-century Indian male writers